Angellika Morton began as a straight size model and transitioned to plus-size modeling in 1997. In 1999, she became the first model to be inducted into the International Model Hall of Fame.

Career
Angellika started modeling in Washington DC during the mid 1980s as a straight size model. Eventually, she ended up with Ford as a plus size model. She has done photo shoots for Talbots, Chatherines, Lane Bryant, Evans, Ulla Popken, Just My Size and others.

Awards and honors
In 1998, she was the first model to appear on two consecutive MODE covers and she has appeared on three covers in total.
In June 1998, she was one of the models on the runway at the first Lane Bryant runway show.
In 1999, she was the first model inducted into the International Model Hall of Fame.

References

American female models
Plus-size models
Year of birth missing (living people)
Living people
Place of birth missing (living people)
21st-century American women